Shara Gillow (born 23 December 1987) is an Australian former professional cyclist, who competed professionally between 2011 and 2020, for the , ,  and  teams. She was selected to represent Australia at the 2012 Summer Olympics, where she finished 13th in the time trial and 39th in the road race.

Personal
Gillow was born on 23 December 1987 in Nambour, Queensland. Her father David Gillow is an Olympic cyclist who represented Zimbabwe at the 1980 Summer Olympics. She attended Nambour Christian College then was home schooled and obtained a Bachelor of Language from Western Sydney Institute. , she lives in Belli, Queensland.

Beyond cycling, Gillow is also a surfer.

Cycling
Gillow is a road cyclist. Her events are the Road Race and Individual Time Trial. She did not become a professional cyclist until she was twenty years old, taking inspiration from her father to get involved with the sport.

Gillow has been coached by Martin Barras since 2010. Her coach said "Gillow was one of the most physically gifted cyclists he had seen, but tended to be too conservative and protective when competing." Her primary training base is in Italy, with a secondary training base in Australia. She is a member of the Sunshine Coast Cycling Club. She has cycling scholarships with the Queensland Academy of Sport and Australian Institute of Sport. She was a member of the  professional cycling team.

Gillow finished 4th at the 2011 Memorial Davide Fardelli in Rogno, Italy. She finished 3rd at the Thüringen Rundfahrt der Frauen in Germany. She finished 9th overall at the 2011 Giro d'Italia Femminile in Italy. She finished 8th at the 2012 La visite chrono du Gatineau in Canada. She finished 7th at the 2012 Prologue GP Elsy Jacobs in Luxembourg. She finished 1st in the individual time trial and 2nd in the road event at the 2012 Oceania Road Championships in Queenstown, New Zealand. She finished 2nd at the 2012 Women's Tour of New Zealand. She finished 1st in the individual time trial event at the 2012 Australian Road Championships in Learmonth, Australia.

Gillow was selected to represent Australia at the 2012 Summer Olympics in the road race and individual time trial. Prior to the Olympics, she raced with Australia's  team in the Giro Donne. She finished 13th in the time trial and 39th in the road race.

In September 2016 it was announced that Gillow would join  for the 2017 season. She spent the rest of her professional career with the team, announcing her retirement in September 2020.

Major results
Source:

2008
 2nd Overall Tour of Bright

2009
 2nd Overall Canberra Tour
 8th Overall Women's Tour of New Zealand
 9th Chrono Champenois

2010
 1st Stage 1 (ITT) Mersey Valley Tour
 8th Time trial, UCI Road World Championships

2011
 Oceania Road Championships
1st  Road race
1st  Time trial
 1st  Time trial, National Road Championships
 3rd Overall Thüringen Rundfahrt der Frauen
 4th Overall Women's Tour of New Zealand
 4th Memorial Davide Fardelli
 7th Chrono Champenois
 9th Overall Giro d'Italia Femminile
1st Stage 2

2012
 Oceania Road Championships
1st  Time trial
2nd  Road race
 National Road Championships
1st  Time trial
7th Road race
 1st Stage 3 Bay Classic Series
 UCI Road World Championships
2nd  Team time trial
10th Time trial
 2nd Overall Women's Tour of New Zealand
 2nd Open de Suède Vårgårda TTT
 8th Chrono Gatineau

2013
 National Road Championships
1st  Time trial
6th Road race
 2nd Overall Thüringen Rundfahrt der Frauen
1st Stage 4 (ITT)
 3rd  Team time trial, UCI Road World Championships
 3rd Open de Suède Vårgårda TTT
 3rd Chrono Champenois – Trophée Européen
 4th Overall Giro d'Italia Femminile
 7th Overall Giro del Trentino Alto Adige-Südtirol
1st Stage 2
 10th Overall Emakumeen Euskal Bira

2014
 Oceania Road Championships
1st  Time trial
3rd  Road race
 National Road Championships
2nd Time trial
9th Road race
 3rd Overall BeNe Ladies Tour
 4th Open de Suède Vårgårda TTT
 6th Time trial, Commonwealth Games
 10th Overall Emakumeen Euskal Bira

2015
 National Road Championships
1st  Time trial
3rd Road race
 1st Crescent Women World Cup Vårgårda TTT
 3rd  Team time trial, UCI Road World Championships
 10th Overall Giro d'Italia Femminile

2016
 2nd Time trial, National Road Championships
 2nd Overall Gracia–Orlová
 Crescent Vårgårda UCI Women's WorldTour
3rd Team time trial
9th Road race
 7th Draai van de Kaai
 8th 7-Dorpenomloop Aalburg
 8th Ridderronde Maastricht
 10th Chrono Champenois

2017
 1st Overall Tour de Charente-Maritime
1st Stages 1 & 2 (ITT)
 National Road Championships
2nd Time trial
5th Road race
 2nd Durango-Durango Emakumeen Saria
 3rd Grand Prix de Plumelec-Morbihan
 5th La Flèche Wallonne Féminine
 5th La Course by Le Tour de France
 6th Strade Bianche
 7th Liège–Bastogne–Liège
 8th Women's Tour de Yorkshire

2018
 National Road Championships
3rd Time trial
7th Road race
 6th La Flèche Wallonne
 7th Durango-Durango Emakumeen Saria
 7th Grand Prix de Plumelec-Morbihan
 8th Overall Setmana Ciclista Valenciana
 8th Overall Women's Tour de Yorkshire
 9th Liège–Bastogne–Liège

2019
 National Road Championships
4th Road race
5th Time trial
 4th Durango-Durango Emakumeen Saria
 9th Overall Tour de Bretagne Féminin
 9th Grand Prix de Plumelec-Morbihan

References

External links
 
 
 
 
 
 

Living people
1987 births
Australian female cyclists
Olympic cyclists of Australia
Cyclists at the 2012 Summer Olympics
Australian Institute of Sport cyclists
Cyclists at the 2014 Commonwealth Games
Commonwealth Games competitors for Australia
Australian people of Zimbabwean descent
People from Nambour, Queensland